Rio Covo may refer to:

Rio Covo (Santa Eugénia), Barcelos, Portugal
Rio Covo (Santa Eulália), Barcelos, Portugal

Parish name disambiguation pages